Mainella is a surname. Notable people with the surname include:

Adrian Mainella, Canadian fashion journalist and television personality
Fran P. Mainella (born 1947), Director of the National Park Service of the United States

See also
Marinella (disambiguation)